Thong Pha Phum National Park is a national park in Kanchanaburi Province, Thailand. The park, located on the border with Myanmar, is part of the Western Forest Complex protected area.

Geography
The park's area is 772,214 rai ~ .

History
On 23 December 2009, Thong Pha Phum became Thailand's 114th National Park.

Attractions
The park has numerous waterfalls and caves. Chok Kradin waterfall descends  over a cliff. Another large waterfall is Khao Yai, with three levels. Other park waterfalls include Dip Yai, Bi Teng and Huai Meuang. Khao Noi cave houses Buddha images. Khao Khat viewpoint offers a panoramic view over the park.

Fauna
Animal species include elephant, tiger, water buffalo, northern red muntjac and civet. Bird life includes hornbills, bulbul and coucal.

See also
List of national parks of Thailand
List of Protected Areas Regional Offices of Thailand

References

National parks of Thailand
Geography of Kanchanaburi province
Tourist attractions in Kanchanaburi province